Navaratna is a Sanskrit compound word meaning "nine gems". It can refer to the following:

 Navaratna - a jewelry style
 Navaratnas - advisors to Vikramaditya and Akbar's courts
 Navaratna (architecture) - an architecture style
 Navratna - in this spelling indicates a government-owned company of India which has certain financial autonomy

It can also refer to:
 the Nav Rattan award - part of the Hind Rattan awards for Indian diaspora